Kärlekslåtar is the solodebut studio album by the Swedish recording artist Lorentz. After two albums released with his younger brother, Sakarias Berger as the previously Grammis-awarded duo Lorentz & Sakarias, he debuted as a solo artist in 2014. The title Kärlekslåtar is Swedish for Love songs, the songs are written in Swedish, including some few terms and expressions in English. He got a Grammis award "Best HipHop/Soul of The Year", for his work of the album.

Track listing

External links 

Lorentz (rapper) albums
2014 albums